Senator Woods may refer to:

Harriett Woods (1927–2007), Missouri State Senate
Jane Woods (born 1946), Virginia State Senate
John M. Woods (1839–1927), Massachusetts State Senate
John Woods (Pennsylvania politician) (1761–1816), Pennsylvania State Senate
Jon Woods (born 1977), Arkansas State Senate
Joseph Andrew Woods (1870–1925), Northern Irish Senate
Laura J. Woods (born 1961), Colorado State Senate
Pat Woods (politician) (born 1940s), New Mexico State Senate
Samuel V. Woods (fl. 1910s), West Virginia State Senate